Ion Lupu is a Moldovan politician, former parliamentarian, member of the Alliance for European Integration and former Minister of Youth and Sports of the Republic of Moldova. He also acted as director of state-owned "Moldsilva" and "Apele Moldovei".

Biography 
Prior to being elected to the Parliament of the Republic of Moldova, Ion Lupu was the Minister of Youth and Sports in 2009.

References

External links 
 Site-ul Parlamentului Republicii Moldova
 Site-ul Partidului Liberal

1963 births
Living people
Liberal Party (Moldova) MPs
Moldovan MPs 2009–2010
Moldovan MPs 2009